Team Jamis was an American UCI Continental cycling team that focused on road bicycle racing. The team was managed by Carine Joannou of Jamis Bicycles with assistance from directeur sportif Sebastian Alexandre.

The disbanded at the end of the 2016 season.

Final roster

Major wins

2005
Stages 2 & 3 Redlands Bicycle Classic, Juan José Haedo
2007
Stage 3 Vuelta por un Chile Líder, Luca Damiani
2008
Stage 2 Tour of the Gila, Tyler Wren
US Air Force Cycling Classic, Lucas Sebastián Haedo
2010
Stage 4b Volta de São Paulo, Alejandro Borrajo
2011
Stage 9 Vuelta Ciclista de Chile, Tyler Wren
Stage 5 Volta do Rio de Janeiro, Eric Schildge
Overall Tour of Elk Grove, Luis Amarán
2012
Stage 4 Tour of the Gila, Alejandro Borrajo
2013
Stage 1 Tour of the Gila, Janier Acevedo
Stage 2 Tour of California, Janier Acevedo
Stage 4 USA Pro Cycling Challenge, Janier Acevedo
2014
Stages 1 & 5 Tour of the Gila, Daniel Jaramillo
Stages 4 Tour of the Gila, Luis Amarán
Stages 3 Grand Prix Cycliste de Saguenay, Juan José Haedo
2015
Stage 1 (ITT) Joe Martin Stage Race, Gregory Brenes
Stage 4 Joe Martin Stage Race, Lucas Sebastián Haedo
Stage 4 Tour of the Gila, Lucas Sebastián Haedo
2016
Stage 1 (ITT) Joe Martin Stage Race, Janier Acevedo
Stage 2 Joe Martin Stage Race, Lucas Sebastián Haedo
Stage 4 Tour of the Gila, Eric Marcotte
Stages 3 & 5 Vuelta a Colombia, Lucas Sebastián Haedo

References

External links

Colavita-Sutter Home
Jamis-Sutter Home team profile at Cycling Archives

Cycling teams based in the United States
UCI Continental Teams (America)
Cycling teams established in 2003